"Big Bad Mama" is a single by American rapper Foxy Brown and American R&B group Dru Hill from the soundtrack to the 1997 film, How to Be a Player. The song also appeared on the European re-issue of Foxy Brown's debut album, Ill Na Na.

The song, which was produced by the Trackmasters and based on an interpolation of Carl Carlton's "She's a Bad Mama Jama", became a semi-successful hit, peaking at 53 on the Billboard Hot 100, Foxy's second highest charting single as a solo artist. The single was released with the then recently reunited EPMD's "Never Seen Before" as the B-side.

Single track listing

A-Side
"Big Bad Mama" (LP version)    
"Big Bad Mama" (instrumental)

B-Side
"Never Seen Before" (LP version)    
"Never Seen Before" (LP instrumental)    
"Never Seen Before" (remix)

Charts

Weekly charts

Year-end charts

References

1997 singles
1997 songs
Def Jam Recordings singles
Dru Hill songs
Foxy Brown (rapper) songs
Song recordings produced by Trackmasters
Songs written by Leon Haywood
Songs written by Jay-Z
Songs written by Jean-Claude Olivier
Songs written by Samuel Barnes (songwriter)